Sir Abdool Raman Mahomed Osman, GCMG, CBE (29 August 1902 – 16 November 1992) was the third governor-general of Mauritius from 27 December 1972 to 31 October 1977. He was knighted in 1973, and was the first non-British Mauritian governor general. The Royal College of Phoenix was renamed Sir Abdool Raman Osman State College, in late 1996.

References 

1902 births
1992 deaths
Governors-General of Mauritius
Knights Grand Cross of the Order of St Michael and St George
Commanders of the Order of the British Empire
Mauritian Knights Bachelor
Mauritian politicians of Indian descent